Louise Sophie Alexandra Skoglund (1862–1938) was a Swedish suffragette, women's rights activist and politician.

Life 
Skoglund was born 22 October 1862 in Stockholm, Sweden. Skoglund graduated from Högre lärarinneseminariet in 1883. She was a teacher at the Åhlinska skolan in 1912–1933. In 1902–1903, she was one of the founders of the National Association for Women's Suffrage. After the Country Association for Women's Suffrage had abandoned its political neutrality in 1911, when the conservative Moderate Party was the only party left opposed to women suffrage, Alexandra Skoglund was one of the right wing suffragists to create the Moderate Association for Women's Suffrage. She was the chairperson in the women's group of the Moderate Party in 1920–1938. Skoglund died 12 February 1938 in Stockholm.

References

Sources 
 Walborg Hedberg – Louise Arosenius: Svenska kvinnor från skilda verksamhetsområden, Stockholm 1914, sid. 93.
 Ann-Cathrine Haglund, Ann-Marie Petersson, Inger Ström-Billing, red (2004). Moderata pionjärer: kvinnor i politiskt arbete 1900–2000. Stockholm: Sällskapet för moderata kvinnors historia. Libris 9666368.  (inb.) Pionjären Alexandra Skoglund, 1862–1938 av Inger Ström-Billing
 L S Alexandra Skoglund, urn:sbl:6020, Svenskt biografiskt lexikon (art av Inger Ström-Billing), hämtad 2014-02-11.

Further reading 
 

1862 births
1938 deaths
Swedish suffragists
Swedish women's rights activists
20th-century Swedish women politicians
20th-century Swedish politicians
Burials at Norra begravningsplatsen